Global Clubbing: Netherlands is a DJ mix album, mixed by trance producer Tiësto, released in 1998.

Track listing
S.B. McCafferty - "Lonely Drive" – 4:44
Stone Factory - "New Sunset" (Olav Basoski Remix) – 5:29
HH - "Planetary" (Original Version) – (2:36)
Pink Bomb Feat. Tracey Cattell - "Indica" (Original Mix) – 6:14
Clear View - "Cry For Love" (DJ Philip Remix) – 5:41
Roze - "Our Love" – 4:57
Channel Tribe - "Neuro Disco" – 4:00
Kamaya Painters - "Endless Wave" – 4:41
Rob Searle - "Planet 303" – 4:58
Interflow - "Beyond Centaury" – 4:11
Starecase - "Reference" (Original Mix) – 5:06
Tilt vs. Paul van Dyk - "Rendezvous" (Quadrophonic Remix) – 5:19
Arrakis - "Medusa (Part 1)" – 6:05
Mystica - "Africa Horizon" (X-Cabs Remix 1) – 3:08
Dos Deviants - "Strange Days" (Original Version) – 6:34

References

1998 compilation albums
Tiësto compilation albums